The City Circle (Melbourne tram route 35) is a zero-fare tram running around the Melbourne central business district in Australia. Aimed mainly at tourists, the route passes many Melbourne attractions while running along the city centre's outermost thoroughfares, as well as the developing Docklands waterfront precinct. It operates in both clockwise and anti-clockwise direction.

History

The tram route was introduced on 29 April 1994, requiring a small track extension along Spring Street, between Collins and Flinders Streets, to enable a complete CBD loop to be formed. The Federal Government's Building Better Cities program funded the $6.4 million capital cost of the track expansion, while the State Government funded the running costs.

Until January 2003, the western leg of the original route of the tram was down Spencer Street, but the route was then extended west to run through Docklands. The travel time around the circle before this change was 40 minutes.

During early 2006, new Passenger Information Displays were installed along with Digital Voice Announcements.

In April 2008, the service adopted the daylight saving timetable on a permanent basis, operating from 10:00 to 21:00 every Thursday, Friday and Saturday. The end of service at other times is 18:00. 

On 30 May 2009, the route was altered for a second time, being extended from Harbour Esplanade to the NewQuay and Waterfront City precincts via Docklands Drive. This made the route an elongated 'q'.

Services after 18:00 between Thursday and Sunday were removed in November 2020.

Route

The route of the City Circle trams roughly follows the outer edges of the Hoddle Grid, with three diversions. It takes in all of La Trobe Street, Harbour Esplanade and Flinders Street. It follows Spring Street between Flinders and Bourke Streets, but travels along Nicholson Street and Victoria Street before turning into La Trobe Street. At the junction of Harbour Esplanade and Latrobe Street trams turn off the loop to run to and from a terminus towards the end of Docklands Drive, Waterfront City.

Operation
The City Circle route is operated with heritage W class trams, restored to original condition as part of the W8 upgrade. As of 2020, these are the only W-class trams on the system, and there are no plans to retire them. The City Circle trams originally sported a unique maroon livery promoting the service, however as part of the W8 upgrade the trams were restored back to their original green and cream livery. Until 2014, the City Circle was one of several routes to run W-class trams (30, 78 and 79) but the remaining routes controversially had their W-class trams removed, mostly replaced by A class. Trams display the route number 35. The City Circle operates at a headway of 12 minutes in both directions, with the service taking approximately 60 minutes to complete a loop. Ten trams are allocated to the service at any one time (five in each direction). An average of three million passengers uses the service every year, with each tram circling the city 9 times a day, or 12 times when the tram operates to 21:00.

Route map

References

External links

035
Zero-fare transport services
1994 establishments in Australia
Melbourne City Centre
Public transport routes in the City of Melbourne (LGA)